Mansion House is a historic home located at McDowell, Highland County, Virginia. It was built in 1851, and is a two-story, three bay, "L"-shaped brick dwelling in the Greek Revival style. It has a central-passage/single-pile-plan. Also on the property are a contributing frame shed, and the sites of a log kitchen structure and outbuilding. The house served as an American Civil War hospital in the time around the Battle of McDowell on May 8, 1862. In 1886, the building was sold to James and Mary Bradshaw, who operated it as a hotel until 1930.

It was listed on the National Register of Historic Places in 2006.

The house is now owned by the Highland County Historical Society and operated as the Highland County Museum.

References

External links
 Highland County Museum - official site

Houses on the National Register of Historic Places in Virginia
Greek Revival houses in Virginia
Houses completed in 1851
Houses in Highland County, Virginia
National Register of Historic Places in Highland County, Virginia
Museums in Highland County, Virginia
History museums in Virginia
1851 establishments in Virginia